Liechtenstein's official language is German, and the principality is the smallest of the four countries in Europe populated by a majority of German speakers.

German and Alemannic
The local German dialect is Alemannic, a dialect (sometimes considered a language) belonging to a highly divergent group including Swiss German (spoken by all Swiss-Germans, the majority of the country), Alsatian (spoken in the Alsace region of France), Germans living in Baden-Württemberg and Bavarian Swabia, and Austrians living in Vorarlberg. Eighty-six percent of the country is "ethnic Alemannic", and are speakers of the language. Highest Alemannic is spoken in the south of the country, and High Alemannic in the rest of the country. It can be difficult to achieve mutual intelligibility  between Alemannic and Standard German, especially with the Highest Alemannic variety.

Notable people 

 Ida Ospelt-Amann (1899-1996), poet who wrote exclusively in the Vaduz dialect

References